Air Serbia serves 60 destinations in 32 countries , including the hubs at Belgrade Nikola Tesla Airport and Niš Constantine the Great Airport. They also operate seasonal charter holiday routes under the Aviolet brand, currently serving destinations in Egypt, Greece, Italy, Morocco, Spain, Tunisia and Turkey.

List

See also 

 List of Jat Airways destinations
 List of Aeroput destinations

References

Air Serbia
Air Serbia